Jogging Fever is a 1981 animated television special and the fourth and final of The Flintstone Special limited-run prime time revival of The Flintstones produced by Hanna-Barbera Productions which premiered on NBC on October 11, 1981.

Jogging Fever was animated at Filman, an animation studio in Madrid, Spain (headed by Carlos Alfonso and Juan Pina) who did a lot of animation work for Hanna-Barbera between the early 1970s through the mid-1980s. This was also notable for being the final television special to feature Hanna-Barbera's controversial studio-made laugh track, which was used throughout the 1970s.

Summary
After failing his annual physical, Fred wants to prove to everyone (including his boss Mr. Slate) that he is in shape, so he decides to become the first citizen of Bedrock to enter the Rockstone Marathon. He wants to become a local celebrity.

Voice cast
Henry Corden as Fred Flintstone
Mel Blanc as Barney Rubble
Jean Vander Pyl as Wilma Flintstone, Pebbles Flintstone
Gay Autterson as Betty Rubble
John Stephenson as Frank Frankenstone, Mr. Slate
Frank Welker as Creepy, Announcer, Dino
Wayne Morton as Additional Voices

Production credits
Executive in Charge of Production: Margaret Loesch
Director: Ray Patterson
Story: Bob Ogle
Story Direction: Tom Yakutis
Recording Director: Alex Lovy
Voices: Gay Autterson, Mel Blanc, Henry Corden, Wayne Morton, John Stephenson, Jean Vander Pyl
Graphics: Iraj Paran, Tom Wogatzke
Musical Director: Hoyt Curtin
Musical Supervisor: Paul DeKorte
Character Design: Terry Morgan, Gary Hoffman, Jack Huber
Layout: Angel Izquierdo
Animation: Alberto Conejo, Julio Diez, Miguel A. Fuertes, Manuel G. Galiana, Roberto Marcano, Matias Marcos, Ezequiel Martin, Pedro Mohedano, Pedro J. Molina, Mariano Rueda
Backgrounds: Francisco Albert, Marcial Del Cerro, Andres Hernandez
Xerography: Javier Alfonso, Jose A. Moreno
Ink and Paint Supervision: Carmen Moreno
Sound Direction: Richard Olson
Camera: Raul Garcia, Santiago Gomez
Supervising Film Editor: Larry C. Cowan
Film Editor: Emiliano Diaz
Dubbing Supervisor: Pat Foley
Music Editors: Joe Sandusky, Terry Moore
Effects Editors: Daniels McLean, Cecil Broughton, Michael Bradley, Catherine McKenzie
Show Editor: Gil Iverson
Negative Consultant: William E. DeBoer
Production Supervisors: Carlos Alfonso, Juan Pina
Post Production Supervisor: Joed Eaton
Producer: Alex Lovy
Executive Producers: Joseph Barbera and William Hanna

Home media
On October 9, 2012, Warner Archive released Jogging Fever on DVD in region 1 as part of their Hanna–Barbera Classics Collection, in a release entitled The Flintstones Prime-Time Specials Collection: Volume 2.  It was a Manufacture-on-Demand release, available exclusively through Warner's online store and Amazon.com.

References

External links

 

1981 television specials
1981 films
1980s American animated films
1980s animated television specials
NBC television specials
1980s American television specials
The Flintstones television specials
Hanna-Barbera television specials
Films directed by Ray Patterson (animator)